Howmeh Rural District is a rural district (dehestan) in the Central District of Masal County, Gilan Province, Iran. At the 2006 census, its population was 9,652, in 2,532 families. The rural district has 16 villages.

References 

Rural Districts of Gilan Province
Masal County